Axiarchism is a metaphysical position that everything that exists, including the universe itself, exists for a good purpose. The word was coined by Canadian philosopher John Leslie.

References

Philosophy of life
Metaphysical theories